United Brethren Church may refer to:

Denominations
 Church of the United Brethren in Christ
 Church of the United Brethren in Christ (Old Constitution)
 Church of the United Brethren in Christ (New Constitution)
 Evangelical United Brethren Church

Buildings and congregations
United Brethren in Christ (Cincinnati, Ohio), listed on the National Register of Historic Places in Cincinnati, Ohio
United Brethren Church (Aurora, Nebraska), listed on the National Register of Historic Places in Hamilton County, Nebraska
United Brethren Church (West Akron, South Dakota), listed on the National Register of Historic Places in Union County, South Dakota